Brett Barron (born September 22, 1959) was a member of the 1984 US Olympic judo team, from San Mateo. He would earn 5 gold in US National Championships and 5 bronze medals.  He injured his shoulder in the 1984 Olympic Games but tied for 9th place. Barron was the 2004 Olympic judo team coach.

References 

American male judoka
Olympic judoka of the United States
Judoka at the 1984 Summer Olympics
Living people
Pan American Games medalists in judo
Pan American Games gold medalists for the United States
Pan American Games bronze medalists for the United States
Judoka at the 1979 Pan American Games
Judoka at the 1983 Pan American Games
Medalists at the 1979 Pan American Games
Medalists at the 1983 Pan American Games
20th-century American people
1959 births